Syndicate Sadists (or "The Executioner Challenges the City"), also released under the titles Rambo's Revenge and Final Payment,  is a 1975 poliziotteschi film directed by Umberto Lenzi. It stars Joseph Cotten and Tomas Milian.

Plot
Milián plays Rambo, an ex-cop who seeks revenge against two powerful crime families who were responsible for the murder of his friend.

Cast
Tomas Milian as Rambo 
Joseph Cotten as Paternò
Adolfo Lastretti as Ciccio Paternò
Mario Piave as Pino Scalia
Maria Fiore as Maria Scalia
Duilio Cruciani as Luigino Scalia
Silvano Tranquilli as Eng. Marco Marsili
Evelyn Stewart as wife of Eng. Marsili
Alessandro Cocco as Giampiero Marsili

Production 
The film predates Ted Kotcheff's First Blood, the film which introduced audiences to the John Rambo of David Morrell by seven years. Tomas Milian happened to read David Morrell's novel while flying from the U.S. to Rome. Loving the story he tried to talk some Italian producers into making a film out of it, with him starring as John Rambo. Nothing came of this, but he was allowed to use the Rambo moniker in the next poliziottesco he starred in.  The film does not borrow elements from the novel, with Lenzi stating he was more influenced by Don Siegel's crime films.

Release
Syndicate Sadists was released in Italy on August 16, 1975 where it was distributed by Medusa. It grossed 1,451,703,190 Italian lire. Film historian Roberto Curti described it as a "huge hit in Italy".

Syndicate Sadists was released in the United States by Sam Sherman's Independent International. It was released in the United States  titles Rambo's Revenge and on home video as Final Payment. It has been released as One Just Man in the United Kingdom. The unrated American DVD of the film is missing two minutes of footage: a scene where the mother of the kidnapped boy comes home and Paterno's henchmen searching for Rambo in a pub, and two reaction shots.

Footnotes

References

External links

1975 films
1970s Italian-language films
1970s crime thriller films
1970s action thriller films
Poliziotteschi films
Films directed by Umberto Lenzi
Films set in Milan
Films scored by Franco Micalizzi
1970s Italian films